Coya AG is a German property and casualties insurance provider headquartered in Berlin offering liability policies for people and pets as well as home content and bicycle theft insurances. Coya delivers insurance policies and handles claims through desktop and mobile apps. 

The company is licensed under the issue by the German Federal Financial Supervisory Authority (BaFin), enabling it to offer its own insurance policies. Coya firstly launched its home content insurance and now offers a variety of insurance products such as private liability, home contents, dog liability, bike theft, e-bike theft and pet health.

History 
Coya was founded in September 2016 by Andrew Shaw, Dr. Peter Hagen and Sebastián Villarroel and started to provide its first approved insurance in June 2018.

Funding 
In its Series A financing round, Coya has received nearly $30 million. The company is strategically and financially backed by investors such as Valar Ventures, e ventures, La Famiglia, and Yabeo Capital, as well as various business angels such as Mato Peric and Rolf Schrömgens. It also received cash injections from PayPal founder Peter Thiel and was in the list of top 30 funded German startups in 2019.

Business model 
Coya's business model is based on a digital paperless insurance that enables customers to get insured quickly and to manage their insurance claims and policies directly through an online dashboard without the need of insurance brokers and agents. As of July 2020 the company is also opening its platform for digital insurance intermediaries and comparison portals.

References 

Insurance companies of Germany
2016 establishments in Germany
Companies based in Berlin